Kuç  may refer to:
Kuç, Devoll, a settlement in Devoll municipality, Albania
Kuç, Shkodër, a settlement in Shkodër municipality, Albania
Kuç, Skrapar, a settlement in Skrapar municipality, Albania
Kuç, Tirana, a settlement in Vorë municipality, Albania
Kuç, Ura Vajgurore, a settlement in Ura Vajgurore municipality, Albania
Kuç, Vlorë, a settlement in Himarë municipality, Albania

See also
Kuc, a surname
Kuči, a highland region in Montenegro